Sam Whitson (born April 11, 1954) is an American politician. He is a retired United States Army colonel. He serves as a Republican member of the Tennessee House of Representatives, where he represents the 65th District (Williamson County).

Early life
Sam Whitson was born on April 11, 1954 in Middle Tennessee.

Whitson graduated from the Glencliff High School in Nashville, Tennessee in 1972. He graduated with a bachelor of science degree from Middle Tennessee State University, where he joined the Reserve Officers' Training Corps (ROTC) program in 1976. He subsequently earned a master in public administration from the University of Oklahoma.

Career
Whitson served in the United States Army from 1976 to 2002. He was the chief of staff of the ROTC Cadet Command for the Eastern region in 2002, when he retired as a colonel. He was awarded the Legion of Merit and the Bronze Star Medal.

Whitson is the chairman of the Franklin Battlefield Commission and the Carter House State Historic Site.

Whiston defeated Jeremy Durham in the Republican primary for the Tennessee House of Representatives in August 2016. In December 2016, he defeated Democratic candidate Holly McCall. As a result, he represents the 65th District (Williamson County).

Personal life
Whitson has a wife, Pam, and two children. They reside in Franklin, Tennessee. He is a Methodist.

References

Living people
1954 births
People from Franklin, Tennessee
Middle Tennessee State University alumni
University of Oklahoma alumni
United States Army colonels
Republican Party members of the Tennessee House of Representatives
21st-century American politicians